Jonne Hjelm (born 14 January 1988) is a Finnish former professional footballer who played as a forward and winger for Finnish clubs Ilves, Tampere United, and Haka, as well as the German club Wehen Wiesbaden. He is the son of Finnish former Tampere United head coach and former footballer Ari Hjelm.

Honours
Tampere United
 Veikkausliiga: 2007
 Finnish Cup: 2007
 Finnish League Cup: 2009

References

External links
 Guardian Football profile
 

1988 births
Living people
Finnish footballers
Association football forwards
Veikkausliiga players
3. Liga players
Tampere United players
FC Haka players
SV Wehen Wiesbaden players
Finnish expatriate footballers
Expatriate footballers in Germany
Finnish expatriate sportspeople in Germany
Footballers from Tampere